There are at least 52 named lakes and reservoirs in Saline County, Arkansas.

Lakes
Dotted Lake, el.  
Dotty Lake, el.  
Masoner Lake, el.

Reservoirs
4-H Camp Lake, el.  
Alcoa Water Supply, el.  
Barr Lake, el.  
Bloomfield Lake, el.  
Brown Lake, el.  
Buffington Lake, el.  
Caldwell Lake, el.  
Cecil Jones Lake, el.  
Clear Lake, el.  
Crystal Lake, el.  
Dawson Lake, el.  
Ferguson Lake, el.  
Hansen Lake, el.  
Happy Valley Lake, el.  
Helmich Lake, el.  
Hester Lake, el.  
Hester Lake, el.  
Holding Pond Number Two Reservoir, el.  
Hurricane Lake, el.  
Indian Springs Lake, el.  
Inman Lake Number Two, el.  
King Lake, el.  
Lake Coronado, el.  
Lake Cortez, el.  
Lake Estrella, el.  
Lake Granada, el.  
Lake Isabella, el.  
Lake Krislor, el.  
Lake Lago, el.  
Lake Maria, el.  
Lake New Moon, el.  
Lake Norrell, el.  
Lake Pauline, el.  
Lake Sylvia, el.  
Lake Winona, el.  
Ledbetter Lake, el.  
Maertins Lake, el.  
Mary Lake, el.  
Mashburn Lake Number One, el.  
Mashburn Lake Number Two, el.  
Old Brown Mud Lakes, el.  
Parker Lake, el.  
Pathway Youth Camp Lake, el.  
Pebble Lake, el.  
Spring Lake, el.  
Styres Lake, el.  
Surge Pond, el.  
 Timber Lake, el.  
Wise Lake, el.

See also
 List of lakes in Arkansas

Notes

Bodies of water of Saline County, Arkansas
Saline